Football in Afghanistan has traditionally been played by men as women were prevented from participating in sports.

Since the fall of the Taliban an Afghanistan women's national football team has been set up to promote the game. 

Many women experience prejudice for playing the sport.

See also
Football in Afghanistan

References